The Superman Emergency Squad (sometimes called the Supermen Emergency Squad) is a fictional superhero team appearing in American comic books published by DC Comics, commonly associated with Superman. They first appeared in "The Mystery of the Tiny Supermen!" in Superman's Pal, Jimmy Olsen #48 (October 1960). They were created by writer Otto Binder and artist Curt Swan.

The squad is a group of volunteers from the bottled city of Kandor, a city from Superman's home planet of Krypton that was shrunk by Brainiac and is kept in a glass jar in Superman's Fortress of Solitude. Outside the bottle, the tiny Kandorians have similar powers to Superman, and when they determine that Superman is in trouble, they can leave the bottle and fly to his assistance. The swarm of Superman-lookalikes uses a special scientific process to enlarge themselves to the size of dolls before heading into the field.

Fictional background

Pre-Crisis
Prior to the Crisis on Infinite Earths reboot, the Superman Emergency Squad is a group of miniaturized Kryptonians from the bottle city of Kandor, which is housed in Superman's Fortress of Solitude. The Squad provides assistance to Superman when he is incapacitated or otherwise occupied. Members of the squad include Superman's look alike cousin Van-Zee (who also uses the secret identity Nightwing), and Don-El, the captain of the Squad. In the early appearances of the Squad, the members were specially selected due to their close resemblance to Superman; later stories dropped this concept. Their costumes were originally modeled on that of Superman but with the 'S' in an elongated triangle.

The Squad goes into action whenever they receive a signal from Superman, or see that he is in trouble while monitoring him. To leave the shrunken city of Kandor, the Squad uses a small rocket ship to fly up to the cork that seals the mouth of the bottle. They then expose themselves to a enlarging gas that causes them to grow from their regular microscopic size to several inches in height. This gives them the ability to force the cork out of the mouth, allowing them access to the outside world (in later stories, the Squad installs a door in the cork, to facilitate exits and entrances). Once outside the bottle city the Squad members, like all natives of Krypton, gain the same powers and abilities as Superman.

Post-Crisis
A new version of the Squad appeared in the Crisis reboot, now renamed Kandorian Emergency Squad. Instead of providing emergency assistance to Superman, it now acts as a policing unit in Kandor. The Squad is led by Cerizah, sister of Superman's ally Ceritak. In Superman: The Man of Steel #100 (May 2000), the Emergency Squad leaves Kandor to help Superman defeat Hank Henshaw. As time passes at a faster rate in Kandor, the current status of the squad is uncertain.

In other media
 The World's Greatest SuperFriends episode "Terror at 20,000 Fathoms" does not directly use the squad but has Kandorian characters perform similar functions. Four Kandorians leave the bottled city to help stop a deadly missile attack after Superman and his more high-powered comrades are incapacitated and the Wonder Twins ask for their help. They do not seem to enlarge themselves. 
 A large crowd of Kandorians gain powers and help Superman in the Legion of Super-Heroes episode "Message in a Bottle". They only do so while in their city and not on special missions, though.

Notes

External links
 Supermanica entry on the pre-Crisis Superman Emergency Squad
Pre-Crisis Superman Emergency Squad at Comic Book Database 

DC Comics extraterrestrial superheroes
DC Comics characters who can move at superhuman speeds
DC Comics characters with accelerated healing
DC Comics characters with superhuman senses
DC Comics characters with superhuman strength
DC Comics superhero teams
Kryptonians